Astrothelium alboverrucoides is a species of corticolous (bark-dwelling) lichen in the family Trypetheliaceae. Found in Indonesia, it was formally described as a new species in 2016 by Dutch lichenologist André Aptroot. No lichen products were detected in the collected specimens.

References

alboverrucoides
Lichen species
Lichens described in 2016
Lichens of Asia
Taxa named by André Aptroot